In Greek mythology, Mopsus (/ˈmɒpsəs/; Ancient Greek: Μόψος, Mopsos), was the Lapith son of Ampyx and a nymph (sometimes named as Chloris and sometimes named Aregonis), born at Titaressa in Thessaly, was also a seer and augur. In Thessaly the place name Mopsion recalled his own. The earliest evidence of him is inscribed on the strap of a soldier's shield, found at Olympia and dated c.600–575 BC.

Mythology 
This Mopsus was one of two seers among the Argonauts, and was said to understand the language of birds, having learned augury from Apollo. He had competed at the funeral-games for Jason's father and was among the Lapiths who fought the Centaurs. While fleeing across the Libyan desert from angry sisters of the slain Gorgon Medusa, Mopsus died from the bite of a viper that had grown from a drop of Medusa's blood. Medea was unable to save him, even by magical means. The Argonauts buried him with a monument by the sea, and a temple was later erected on the site.

Ovid places him also at the hunt of the Calydonian Boar, although the hunt occurred after the Argonauts' return and Mopsus' supposed death.

Notes 

Argonauts

References 

 Gaius Julius Hyginus, Fabulae from The Myths of Hyginus translated and edited by Mary Grant. University of Kansas Publications in Humanistic Studies. Online version at the Topos Text Project.
 The Orphic Argonautica, translated by Jason Colavito. © Copyright 2011. Online version at the Topos Text Project.
 Publius Ovidius Naso, Metamorphoses translated by Brookes More (1859-1942). Boston, Cornhill Publishing Co. 1922. Online version at the Perseus Digital Library.
 Publius Ovidius Naso, Metamorphoses. Hugo Magnus. Gotha (Germany). Friedr. Andr. Perthes. 1892. Latin text available at the Perseus Digital Library.

Lapiths in Greek mythology